Welfare Party of India is an Indian Political party, Welfare Party of India to contest polls, striving for what it deems "value-based politics" in India.
Its first National President was Mujtaba Farooq, and other key leaders were  Syed Qasim Rasool Ilyas, Ilyas Azmi, Zafarul Islam Khan, Maulana Abdul Wahab Khilji and Lalita Naik.
It works across India with state and district level committees.

History 
WPI founded in 2011 under leadership of Syed  Qasim Rasool Ilyas in Delhi. Party condemned demonetization by the Government of India.

Known branches 
The Welfare Party of Kerala is the Kerala unit of the Welfare Party of India. It was launched on 19 October 2011 at Tagore Hall, Kozhikode.

The organization argues for comprehensive land reform. Several struggles and seminars were organized by the landless people of Kerala.

It has a students' wing called Fraternity Movement.

See also 
 Fraternity Movement

References

External links 

 

 
Political parties established in 2011
2011 establishments in India